Grayvoron is a town and the administrative center of Grayvoronsky District in Belgorod Oblast, Russia, located on the shores of the Vorskla (a tributary of the Dnieper) and Grayvoronka Rivers. Population:  It was previously known as Grayvorony (until 1838).

History
The sloboda of Grayvorony was founded on August 5, 1678. It was granted town status and given its present name in 1838.

Administrative and municipal status
Within the framework of administrative divisions, Grayvoron serves as the administrative center of Grayvoronsky District, to which it is directly subordinated. As a municipal division, the town of Grayvoron, together with the selo of Lugovka in Grayvoronsky District, is incorporated within Grayvoronsky Municipal District as Grayvoron Urban Settlement.

Notable people
Grayvoron is the birthplace of the Russian engineer and inventor Vladimir Shukhov.

References

Notes

Sources

External links
Official website of Grayvoron 
Grayvoron Business Directory  

Cities and towns in Belgorod Oblast
Populated places in Grayvoronsky District
Grayvoronsky Uyezd
Populated places established in 1678
Vladimir Shukhov
1678 establishments in Russia